The fifteenth series of Dancing on Ice began airing on ITV on 15 January 2023. During the finale of the fourteenth series, it was announced that Dancing on Ice had been renewed for another series. The series was once again filmed in the purpose-built studio at Bovingdon Airfield, which was set up for the tenth series. Phillip Schofield and Holly Willoughby returned to present the series, whilst Christopher Dean, Jayne Torvill, Ashley Banjo and Oti Mabuse also returned to the judging panel. This series decreased the number of live shows to nine weeks instead of ten, and featured one less celebrity contestant than usual.

For the first time in the shows history, Torvill and Dean were unable to perform the Boléro, as Torvill suffered an arm injury, which she later confirmed, that she had ruptured her bicep in training, and would require surgery.

This series also saw Nile make history, as he became the first ever male skater to perform the dangerous manoeuvre  "the headbanger", which sees the skater being picked up by their ankle, then spun round by their partner.

Professional skaters
On 28 October 2022, the professional skaters returning from the previous series were announced as Matt Evers, Alexandra Schauman, Łukasz Różycki, Mark Hanretty, Vanessa Bauer, Brendyn Hatfield and Tippy Packard, along with Colin Grafton who received a partner for the first time. Andy Buchanan, Robin Johnstone, Angela Egan, Joe Johnson, and reigning champion Karina Manta did not return. They were replaced by Sylvain Longchambon, who received a partner for the first time since the eleventh series, Klabera Komini and Vicky Ogden, both of whom last appeared in the thirteenth series, as well as new skater Olivia Smart. Komini and Smart both received partners, whilst Ogden took part in professional group routines and was used as a reserve professional.

Couples
On 3 October 2022, Patsy Palmer was announced as the first celebrity to be participating in the series. More celebrities continued to be revealed throughout the week before the line-up was concluded on 11 October. Due to the series being a week shorter than usual, only eleven couples competed, the fewest since the second series in 2007.

Scoring chart

 indicates the couple eliminated that week
 indicates the couple were in the skate-off but not eliminated
 indicates the couple withdrew from the competition
 indicates the winning couple
 indicates the runner-up couple
 indicates the third-place couple
 indicate the highest score for that week
 indicate the lowest score for that week
"—" indicates the couple(s) that did not skate that week

Average chart
This table only counts for dances scored on a traditional 40-point scale. The extra points from the Skate Battle are not included.

Live show details

Week 1 (15 January)
 Group performance: "I Wanna Dance with Somebody (Who Loves Me) (David Solomon Remix)"—Whitney Houston & David Solomon (all)
 "Never Tear Us Apart"—Paloma Faith (performed by professional skaters)

The couple with the lowest votes from Week 1 will go up against the couple with the lowest votes from Week 2 in the Skate-off.

Week 2 (22 January)
 Head judge: Torvill
 Group performance: "Dancin' Fool"—Barry Manilow
 Torvill & Dean performance: "Higher"—Michael Bublé

The couple with the lowest votes from this week will go up against Ekin-Su & Brendyn, the couple with the lowest votes from Week 1, in the Skate-off.
 
Save Me skates
 Ekin-Su & Brendyn: "No Tears Left to Cry"—Ariana Grande
 John & Alexandra: "Spirit in the Sky"—Doctor and the Medics
Judges' votes to save
Banjo: Ekin-Su & Brendyn
Dean: Ekin-Su & Brendyn
Mabuse: Ekin-Su & Brendyn
Torvill: Did not need to vote but would have saved Ekin-Su & Brendyn

Week 3 (29 January)
 Theme: Musicals
 Special musical guest: "Proud Mary"—from Tina: The Tina Turner Musical

In a twist to this week's elimination, there was no skate-off. Instead, the couple with the lowest combined judges' score and public vote was eliminated.

Week 4 (5 February)
 Theme: Dance
 Head judge: Dean
 Group performance: "Both Sides, Now"—Josh Groban feat. Sara Bareilles (performed by Mark Hanretty & Olivia Smart)

Save Me skates
 Ekin-Su & Brendyn: "No Tears Left to Cry"—Ariana Grande
 Patsy & Matt: "Never Forget You"—Noisettes
Judges' votes to save
Banjo: Patsy & Matt
Mabuse: Patsy & Matt
Torvill: Patsy & Matt
Dean: Did not need to vote but would have saved Patsy & Matt

Week 5 (12 February)
 Theme: Icons
 Head judge: Torvill
 Special musical guest: "Johnny B. Goode"—from Back to the Future: The Musical

Due to Siva Kaneswaran suffering from a chest infection, Siva & Klabera did not perform this week.

Save Me skates
 Patsy & Matt: "Never Forget You"—Noisettes
 Darren & Tippy: "Ain't Giving Up"—Craig David & Sigala
Judges' votes to save
Banjo: Darren & Tippy
Mabuse: Darren & Tippy
Dean: Darren & Tippy
Torvill: Did not need to vote but would have saved Darren & Tippy

Week 6 (19 February)
 Theme: Movies
 Head judge: Dean
 Guest performance: Diversity—"Caught Up"—Usher

Save Me skates
 Darren & Tippy: "Ain't Giving Up"—Craig David & Sigala
 Siva & Klabera: "Say You Won't Let Go"—James Arthur
Judges' votes to save
Banjo: Siva & Klabera
Mabuse: Siva & Klabera
Torvill: Siva & Klabera
Dean: Did not need to vote but would have saved Siva & Klabera

Week 7 (26 February)
 Theme: Props
 Head judge: Torvill
 Group performance: "I Hope I Get It"—from A Chorus Line/ "Fame"—from Fame (performed by professional skaters)

Save Me skates
 Carley & Mark: "Stop This Flame"—Celeste
 Siva & Klabera: "Say You Won't Let Go"—James Arthur
Judges' votes to save
 Banjo: Siva & Klabera
 Mabuse: Siva & Klabera
 Dean: Siva & Klabera
 Torvill: Did not need to vote but would have saved Siva & Klabera

Week 8: Semi-final (5 March)
 Theme: Solo skate
 Head judge: Dean
 Special musical guest: "Can't Tame Her"—Zara Larsson
Group performance: "Music for a Sushi Restaurant"—Harry Styles (performed by professional skaters)
"Live and Let Die"—Guns N' Roses (Solo Skate Battle)

Save Me skates
 Mollie & Sylvain:  "Keeping Your Head Up"—Birdy
 Siva & Klabera:  "Three Times a Lady"—Commodores
 Joey & Vanessa: "Power Over Me"—Dermot Kennedy
Judges' votes to save
 Banjo: Joey & Vanessa
 Mabuse: Joey & Vanessa
 Torvill: Joey & Vanessa
 Dean: Did not need to vote but would have voted to save Joey & Vanessa

Week 9: Final (12 March)
 Themes: Showcase, Skate Battle; Boléro
Group performance: "Celestial"—Ed Sheeran (performed by professional skaters)
"Survivor"—2WEI feat. Edda Hayes" (Skate Battle)

Ratings
Official ratings are taken from BARB. Viewing figures are from 7 day data.

References

External links
 Official website

Series 15
2023 British television seasons